The Revolutionary Workers League is a small Trotskyist group formed in the United States in the late 1970s. The RWL still has about 20 active members.

History 

The RWL was founded in 1976 by Peter Sollenberger and Leland Sanderson two former Harvard graduate students from Detroit. Although Sollenberger and Sanderson were briefly contacts of the Spartacist League, neither of them was ever a member. They organized among clerical workers at the University of Michigan, Ann Arbor as well as among LGBT rights groups. In 1981 they absorbed the Socialist League (Democratic-Centralist), a group of ex-adherents of Tim Wohlforth that had been expelled from the Workers League of the United States in the mid-1970s. The SL(DC), shrinking since its formation, led by Steve Zeltzer, and had its main base in San Francisco. By 1982 the RWL was credited with about 40 members.

The RWL supported anti-administration forces within the United Auto Workers. They backed the United Front Caucus in the November 1982 elections in Local 600 at River Rouge, Michigan, which secured 10% of the vote. It was unclear how many members the RWL had within Local 600. The RWL also worked within the Peace & Freedom Party in California. There they formed a bloc with members of the Internationalist Workers Party (Fourth International) at the August 1984 convention against a majority dominated by the Communist Party USA.

Negotiations had been opened up between the RWL and the IWP(FI) since October 1982. The RWL participated in the IWP(FI)s Emergency National Trotskyist Conference in 1983 and accepted the IWP(FI)s invitation to participate in the Morenoist  International Workers League (Fourth International) world congress in 1984. the RWL had been affiliated with Alan Thornetts Trotskyist International Liaison Committee from the late 1970s until at least after the Falklands War of 1982. In the summer of 1984, RWL members participated in the founding conference of the International Trotskyist Committee for the Political Regeneration of the Fourth International (ITC).

In 1991, a group of RWL members, including founding member Peter Sollenberger, left to form the Trotskyist League.  The Revolutionary Workers League maintained a website at rwl-us.org and rwlus.org until 2006. The ITC's current website is https://www.itc4.org/. It formed the Civil Rights organization, the Coalition to Defend Affirmative Action, Integration & Immigrant Rights, and Fight for Equality By Any Means Necessary (BAMN), in 1995 whose headquarters is in Detroit. BAMN continues to organize high-profile direct actions at UC Berkeley and elsewhere in California.

Publications 
Down with the Carter-Reagan war drive! Detroit, Mich.: Revolutionary Workers League; San Francisco, Calif.: Socialist League (Democratic-Centralist), 1981
Socialism and black liberation: a statement by a black revolutionary from the Revolutionary Workers League. Detroit, Mich.: Revolutionary Workers League, 1981
Theses on pornography: adopted by the fifth national conference of the Revolutionary Workers League/US, 27 May 1985. S.l. : The League, 1985

Notes

References
 Alexander, Robert (1991). International Trotskyism: A Documented Analysis of the World Movement Durham, Duke University Press.

External links 
Archived website
Specially Oppressed and the Proletarian Vanguard Adopted by the First National Conference of the Revolutionary Workers League/US 13 April 1981- Revised 5 October 1987

Political parties established in 1976
Trotskyist organizations in the United States
Communist organizations in the United States